The 1868–69 United States House of Representatives elections were held on various dates in various states between June 1, 1868 and August 2, 1869. Each state set its own date for its elections to the House of Representatives before or after the first session of the 41st United States Congress convened on March 4, 1869. They coincided with the 1868 United States presidential election, which was won by Ulysses S. Grant. Elections were held for all 243 seats, representing 37 states. All of the former Confederate states were represented in Congress for the first time since they seceded from the Union.

The Democrats gained 20 seats, but Grant's Republican Party retained a commanding majority in the Reconstruction era following the American Civil War, holding onto a firm legitimacy through an association with victory. As more Southern states exited Reconstruction, more Democratic seats appeared in the South. However, Democratic gains in the South were limited, as the Republican power-brokers of Reconstruction held a great deal of influence. The small Conservative Party of Virginia also picked up several seats in Virginia, as it had support among wealthy Southern leaders who wanted to increase the region's power.

Election summary 
Mississippi, Texas, and Virginia were readmitted during this Congress, leaving Congress without vacant State delegations for the first time since 1860. Georgia had been partially readmitted in the previous Congress, but was not initially admitted to the 41st Congress. With Georgia's final readmission in 1870, all former Confederate states were once more represented in Congress.

Election dates 
Mississippi held rejected elections on July 1, 1868.  New (accepted) elections were held December 1, 1869.

In 1845, Congress passed a law providing for a uniform nationwide date for choosing presidential electors. This law did not affect election dates for Congress, which remained within the jurisdiction of State governments, but over time, the States moved their congressional elections to that date. 1868 was the first year in which the majority of States (20 of 37) held their elections on that date. There were still 9 states which held elections before that date and 4 that held regular elections after that date, in addition to 4 readmitted states that held elections after that date.

 Early dates (1868):
 June 1:  Oregon
 September 1:  Vermont
 September 14:  Maine
 October 13:  Indiana, Iowa, Nebraska, Ohio, Pennsylvania
 October 22:  West Virginia
 Late dates (regular elections):
 December 29, 1868:  Florida
 March 9, 1869:  New Hampshire
 April 5, 1869:  Connecticut
 August 2, 1869:  Alabama
 Readmitted states:
 July 6, 1869:  Virginia
 December 1, 1869:  Mississippi (also held elections to the 42nd Congress on the same day)
 December 3, 1868:  Texas
 December 20–22, 1870:  Georgia

Special elections 

There were special elections in 1868 and 1869 to the 40th United States Congress and 41st United States Congress.

Special elections are sorted by date then district.

40th Congress 
Readmission of state are treated here as regular (late) elections, not special elections.

41st Congress 
Readmission of state are treated here as regular (late) elections, not special elections.

Alabama

1868 elections to finish the term

1869 elections to the next term

Arkansas

California 

California's delegation remained at two Democrats and one Republican.

Colorado Territory 
See non-voting delegates, below.

Dakota Territory 
See non-voting delegates, below.

Connecticut

Delaware

Florida 

Florida had been unrepresented in Congress since January 21, 1861, when its sole member and both senators withdrew from Congress following the secession of Florida from the Union.  Following the end of the Civil War, an election had been held in 1865, but it was rejected by Congress.  In 1868, Congress readmitted Florida following Reconstruction.

Election to the current term 
The first election, for the duration of the 40th congress, was held May 5, 1868.
 

Hamilton was seated on July 1, 1868, during the 2nd session of the 40th Congress.

Election to the next term 
Florida elected its one at-large member on December 29, 1868, re-electing Hamilton, who had just been elected in May to finish the current term. Georgia 

 Idaho Territory 
See non-voting delegates, below.

 Illinois 

 Indiana 

 Iowa 

 Kansas 

 Kentucky 

 Louisiana 

 Maine 

 Maryland 

 Massachusetts 

|-
! 
| Thomas D. Eliot
|  | Republican
| 1858
|  |Incumbent retired.New member elected.Republican hold.
| nowrap | 

|-
! 
| Oakes Ames
|  | Republican
| 1862
| Incumbent re-elected.
| nowrap | 

|-
! 
| Ginery Twichell
|  | Republican
| 1866
| Incumbent re-elected.
| nowrap | 

|-
! 
| Samuel Hooper
|  | Republican
| 1861 (special)
| Incumbent re-elected.
| nowrap | 

|-
! 
| Benjamin Butler
|  | Republican
| 1866
| Incumbent re-elected.
| nowrap | 

|-
! 
| Nathaniel P. Banks
|  | Republican
| 1865 (special)
| Incumbent re-elected.
| nowrap | 

|-
! 
| George S. Boutwell
|  | Republican
| 1862
| Incumbent re-elected.
| nowrap | 
|-
! 
| George F. Hoar
|  | Republican
| 1862
|  | Incumbent retired.New member elected.Republican hold.
| nowrap | 

|-
! 
| William B. Washburn
|  | Republican
| 1862
| Incumbent re-elected.
| nowrap | 

|-
| 
| Henry L. Dawes
|  | Republican
| 1856
| Incumbent re-elected.
| nowrap | 

|}

 Michigan 

 Minnesota 

 Mississippi 

 1868 rejected elections 

Mississippi elected its members July 1, 1868, but that election was later rejected by the House.

 1869 accepted elections 
Mississippi then held new elections December 1, 1869 both: to finish the term in the 40th Congress and to the next term (starting in 1871) in the 41st Congress.  Both elections had the same vote totals and were accepted by the House.  The new members were seated in 1870.

 Missouri 

 Montana Territory 
See non-voting delegates, below.

 Nebraska 

|-
! 
| John Taffe
|  | Republican 
| 1866
| Incumbent re-elected.
| nowrap | 

|}

 Nevada 

 New Hampshire 

 New Jersey 

 New Mexico Territory 
See non-voting delegates, below.

 New York 

 North Carolina 

 Ohio 

 Oregon 

 Pennsylvania 

 Rhode Island 

 South Carolina 

 Tennessee 

|-
! 
| Roderick R. Butler
|  | Republican 
| 1867
| Incumbent re-elected.
| nowrap | 

|-
! 
| Horace Maynard
|  | Republican
| 1865
| Incumbent re-elected.
| nowrap | 

|-
! 
| William B. Stokes
|  | Republican
| 1865
| Incumbent re-elected.
| nowrap | 

|-
! 
| James Mullins
|  | Republican
| 1867
|  |Incumbent retired.New member elected.Republican hold.|  nowrap | 

|-
! 
| John Trimble
|  | Republican
| 1867
|  |Incumbent retired.New member elected.Republican hold.| nowrap | 

|-
! 
| Samuel M. Arnell
|  | Republican
| 1865
| Incumbent re-elected.
|  

|-
! 
| Isaac R. Hawkins
|  | Republican
| 1865
| Incumbent re-elected.
| nowrap | 

|-
! 
| David A. Nunn
|  | Republican
| 1867
|  |Incumbent lost re-election as an Independent Republican.New member elected.Republican hold.| nowrap | 

|}

 Texas 

 Utah Territory 
See non-voting delegates, below.

 Vermont 

 Virginia 

 Washington Territory 
See non-voting delegates, below.

 West Virginia 

|-
! 
| Chester D. Hubbard
|  | Republican
| 1864
|  | Incumbent lost renomination.New member elected.Republican hold.| nowrap | 

|-
! 
| Bethuel Kitchen
|  | Republican
| 1866
|  | Incumbent retired.New member elected.Republican hold.| nowrap | 

|-
! 
| Daniel Polsley
|  | Republican
| 1866
|  | Incumbent retired.New member elected.Republican hold.'''
| nowrap | 

|}

Wisconsin 

Wisconsin elected six members of congress on Election Day, November 3, 1868.

Non-voting delegates

Colorado Territory

Montana Territory 
The election date is speculative.

Idaho Territory

Wyoming Territory 

On July 25, 1868, an act of Congress gave Wyoming Territory the authority to elect a congressional delegate, although the first delegate did not take his seat until 1869.

See also 
 1868 United States elections
 1868 United States presidential election
 1868–69 United States Senate elections
 40th United States Congress
 41st United States Congress

Notes

References

Bibliography

External links 
 Office of the Historian (Office of Art & Archives, Office of the Clerk, U.S. House of Representatives)